Novye Omutishchi is a rural locality (a village) in Petushinskoye Rural Settlement, Petushinsky District, Vladimir Oblast, Russia. The population was 19 as of 2010. There are 2 streets.

Geography 
Novye Omutishchi is located 10 km west of Petushki (the district's administrative centre) by road. Staroye Semenkovo is the nearest rural locality.

References 

Rural localities in Petushinsky District